Goodman is an unincorporated census-designated place located in the town of Goodman, Marinette County, Wisconsin, United States. Goodman has a post office with ZIP code 54125. As of the 2010 census, its population is 271.

References

Census-designated places in Marinette County, Wisconsin
Census-designated places in Wisconsin